Secuestro en Acapulco-Canta Chamo is a 1983 Venezuelan-Mexican teen musical comedy film, starring the well known Venezuelan boy band, Los Chamos, as well as Mexican actor Cesar Bono (in one of his early films), Mexican actress Lucila Mariscal, Mexican singer and actress Yuri, and Mexican actress Maria Antonieta de las Nieves. The movie was released internationally during 1983. It has a duration of 90 minutes.

Plot 
Los Chamos, a Venezuelan boy band, arrive in Mexico for a series of concerts. While there, they meet their tour manager, "Benita" (Mariscal), singer "Rosita" (Yuri) and one particular fan, "Carlota", (de las Nieves) who intends to kidnap one of the band members, during a visit to Acapulco, Guerrero for a concert, to keep him as a boyfriend.

The group also meets and helps a young female fan who needs a medical operation.

Cast 
Argenis Brito - as Chamo Argenis
William Márquez Uzcategui - as Chamo Will
Walter Márquez Uzcategui - as Chamo Walter
Winston Márquez Uzcategui - as Chamo Winston
Enrique Couselo - as Chamo Enrique
Gabriel Fernandez - as Chamo Gabriel
María Antonieta de las Nieves - as Carlota
Yuri - as Rosita
Lucila Mariscal - as Benita
Cesar Bono - as musical representant

Other information 
During the movie's filming, several cast members became friends; Gabriel Fernandez of Los Chamos and co-star Yuri had a short but well publicized romance. The two later married other people and remained as life-long friends.

See also 
La Pandilla en Apuros - a film starring Spanish teen group La Pandilla
Coneccion Caribe - a film starring boy band Los Chicos de Puerto Rico
Menudo:La Pelicula - a film starring Puerto Rican boy band Menudo
Una Aventura Llamada Menudo - a film starring Puerto Rican boy band Menudo

References 

1983 films
Mexican comedy films
Venezuelan comedy films
1980s Mexican films